Belmont is an unincorporated community in Coffee County, in the U.S. state of Tennessee.

The original owner of the town site, a native of Belmont County, Ohio, selected the name.

References

Unincorporated communities in Coffee County, Tennessee
Unincorporated communities in Tennessee